"Sweet and Tender Hooligan" is a song by the English rock band the Smiths, written by singer Morrissey and guitarist Johnny Marr. Recorded in 1986, it was released as a single in May 1995 by Sire Records to promote the compilation album Singles.

Background
Whereas WEA in Europe opted to re-issue the 1986 single "Ask" to promote Singles, Sire in America thought it wiser to put out a single containing rarities, even though none of them featured on the actual compilation, as neither "Sweet and Tender Hooligan" itself nor its supporting tracks had been previously released as a single. The title track had previously been recorded for the BBC and included on Louder Than Bombs and the 12" of "Sheila Take a Bow"; "I Keep Mine Hidden", "Work Is a Four-Letter Word" and "What's the World?" were previously hard-to-find B-sides to earlier singles "Girlfriend in a Coma" and "I Started Something I Couldn't Finish" (both 1987).

Lyric
The lyric describes the lenient sentencing of a hooligan, with the narrator sarcastically taking the side of the criminal, saying "and he'll never ever do it again / of course he won't / not until the next time".

Track listing
 "Sweet and Tender Hooligan" (Morrissey, Johnny Marr) – 3:35
 "I Keep Mine Hidden" (Morrissey, Marr) – 1:59
 "Work Is a Four-Letter Word" (Guy Woolfenden, Don Black) – 2:47
 "What's the World?" (live) (Tim Booth, Jim Glennie, Paul Gilbertson, Gavan Whelan) – 2:06

Artwork
The single cover features a still of boxer Cornelius Carr from the music video for Morrissey's single "Boxers", as directed by James O'Brien in 1995.

Reviews

Jack Rabid of Allmusic described this song as "one of their great punk-inspired moments (along with "London") and as usual, should have been the A-side anyway."

Notes

The Smiths songs
1995 singles
Songs written by Morrissey
Songs written by Johnny Marr
Songs about criminals